Wesley Girls' High School (WGHS) is an educational institution for girls in Cape Coast in the Central region of Ghana. It was founded in 1836 by Harriet Wrigley, the wife of a Methodist minister. The school is named after the founder of Methodism, John Wesley.

History 
Wesley Girls' High School was ranked 68th out of the top 100 best high schools in Africa by Africa Almanac in 2003, based upon quality of education, student engagement, strength and activities of alumnae, school profile, internet and news visibility.

Achievements 
 Won the Sprite Ball Championship in 2008 and 2016

Notable alumni 

 Rosina Acheampong, educationist, first female deputy director general of the GES, first Ghanaian headmistress of Wesley Girls High School
 Jemila Abdulai, blogger, writer and digital marketer
 Barbara Frances Ackah-Yensu,  active justice of the Supreme Court of Ghana (2022–)
 Rosamond Asiamah Nkansah, 1st police woman in Ghana
 Betty Acquah, feminist painter
 Adina, musician
 Sophia Ophilia Adjeibea Adinyira, justice of the Supreme Court of Ghana (2006 – 2019) 
Dedo Difie Agyarko-Kusi, Ghana Ambassador to South Korea (2017–2021)
 Agnes Aggrey-Orleans, Ghanaian diplomat
 Zanetor Agyeman-Rawlings, member of parliament for Klottey Korle Constituency
 Mabel Agyemang, Chief Justice of the Turks and Caicos Islands, first female Chief Justice of The Gambia (2013-2014)
 Ama Ata Aidoo, award-winning author, academic, former Minister of Education
 Sophia Akuffo, 13th Chief Justice of Ghana
 Patience Akyianu, banker; managing director of Barclays Bank Ghana
 Akosua Addai Amoo, Sports journalist
 Grace Amponsah-Ababio, a retired diplomat
 Abena Osei Asare, member of parliament for Atiwa East
 Gladys Asmah, former Minister of Fisheries
 Becca, musician
 Sylvia Boye, former Chief Executive and first female Registrar of West Africa Examinations Council
 Mary Chinery-Hesse, former civil servant and first female director of International Labor Organization, United Nations
 Melody Millicent Danquah, first female pilot in Africa
 Mercy Yvonne Debrah-Karikari, first female to be Secretary to the Cabinet
 Rita Akosua Dickson, Vice Chancellor of KNUST
 Florence Dolphyne, first female Professor and first female Pro-vice Chancellor, University of Ghana, Legon
 Efua Dorkenoo, activist
 Brigitte Dzogbenuku, Presidential candidate (2020) & Vice Presidential candidate (2016) for the Progressive People's Party
 Constance Edjeani-Afenu, first female brigadier general of the Ghana Armed Forces, Deputy Military Adviser to Ghana's permanent Mission in New York
 Mary Grant, Ghana's first female council of state member; first alumna to be a medical doctor
 Afua Adwo Jectey Hesse, chief executive officer of the Korle Bu Teaching Hospital
 Lovelace Johnson, active Justice of the Supreme Court of Ghana (2019–)
 Jennifer Koranteng, model and fashion designer
 Eva Lokko, engineer and former managing director of the Ghana Broadcasting Corporation
 Alima Mahama, lawyer and former Minister for the affairs of women and children in Ghana
 Joy Henrietta Mensa-Bonsu, a law professor and member of the United Nations Independent Panel On Peace Operations; active Justice of the Supreme Court of Ghana (2020–)
 Akosua Menu, deputy CEO of National Youth Authority
 Joyce Bawah Mogtari, Lawyer and Former Deputy Minister of Transport
 Emma Morrison, television personality and media professional
 Jane Naana Opoku-Agyemang, first female Vice-Chancellor of a state University in Ghana
 Peace Ayisi Otchere, first female director of the African Development Bank
 Rose Constance Owusu, former justice of the Supreme Court of Ghana (2008 – 2014)
 Deborah Owusu-Bonsu, musician, television presenter and model
 Martha Akyaa Pobee, Diplomat, Permanent Member to the United Nations,
 Lucy Quist, first Ghanaian woman to become the CEO of a multinational telecommunications company in Ghana
 Mabel Simpson, fashion designer
 Hanna Tetteh, former Minister for Trade and Industry and former Minister for Foreign Affairs
 Gertrude Torkornoo, active Justice of the Supreme Court of Ghana (2019–)
 Yvonne Tsikata, international economist and first Ghanaian woman to become vice president at the World Bank
 Julia Osei Tutu, wife of Asantehene, Otumfuo Nana Osei Tutu II
 Georgina Theodora Wood, former police prosecution officer, first female Chief Justice of Ghana
Nana Oye Mansa Yeboaa, first female deputy Governor of the Bank of Ghana, and former Ghanaian diplomat
 Vida Yeboah, minister of state in the Rawlings government, former Headmistress of Mfanstiman Girls' Secondary School

References

External links
 http://www.wesleygirlshighalumni.org/home/inthenews.html
 http://www.fiankoma.org/ftp/wesley_schoolsite/
 http://www.IDCE-world.org

High schools in Ghana
Cape Coast
Girls' schools in Ghana
Educational institutions established in 1836
Boarding schools in Ghana
Christian schools in Ghana
Public schools in Ghana
Methodist schools
1836 establishments in the British Empire